Jim Leis (born October 10, 1959) is an Australian former professional rugby league footballer who played in the 1980s.

Playing career
A New South Wales representative forward, he played in the New South Wales Rugby League (NSWRL) competition for Western Suburbs for three seasons between 1980 and 1982, Canterbury-Bankstown for three seasons between 1983–1985 and the Cronulla-Sutherland Sharks for two seasons between 1986 and 1987.

In the same year he was selected to tour New Zealand with the Australian national team although he did not play in a test, and earned two Dally M awards in 1980 for lock-forward of the year and rookie of the year. He retired after the 1987 season after eight seasons in first grade.

Leis was named at lock in the Western Suburbs Magpies Team of the Eighties.

Starting his career in the country, Leis is a supporter promoting rugby league in country regions.

References

1959 births
Living people
Australia national rugby league team players
Australian rugby league players
New South Wales Rugby League State of Origin players
Country New South Wales rugby league team players
Canterbury-Bankstown Bulldogs players
Cronulla-Sutherland Sharks players
Rugby league players from New South Wales
Rugby league locks
Western Suburbs Magpies players